Cuby is a village and former civil parish, now in the parish of Tregony with Cuby in Cornwall, England, United Kingdom, situated approximately 7 miles (12 km) southwest of St Austell. In 2011 it had a population of 178.

Cornelly parish was united with Cuby in 1934.

In November 2020, the parish council voted to merge with neighbouring Tregony. Both villages are now part of the parish of 'Tregony with Cuby' that came into effect on 1 April 2021.

Cuby Parish Church

The church of Cuby is dedicated to Saint Cuby, a Cornish saint: since the parish church of Tregony was lost to the River Fal c. 1540 Cuby Parish Church has been in fact the parish church of Tregony also. The church was rebuilt in 1828 though some of the medieval masonry still exists on the north side and the tower (of two stages) is of the 14th century. In the south aisle is an inscribed stone of the 6th or 7th century (Nonnita Ercilini Rigati [...]tris Fili Ercilini). The church in Norman times belonged to the alien priory at Tregony but in 1278 ownership passed to Merton Priory in Surrey.

Notable person
William Hennah, first lieutenant of HMS Mars is buried at Cuby Parish Church. His ship was part of the British fleet under Lord Nelson at the Battle of Trafalgar.

References

External links

Villages in Cornwall
Former civil parishes in Cornwall